The Porto Novo Super Cup, known as the Filipe de Bitú Super Cup (Portuguese: Super-Taça de Filipe de Bitú) is a regional football (soccer) super cup competition played during the season in the southern and westernmost parts of Santo Antão Island, Cape Verde.  The super cup is organized by the Santo Antão South Regional Football Association (Associação Regional de Futebol de Zona Sul do Santo Antão, ARFZSSA). The regional champion competes with a regional cup winner. When a club wins both the regional championship and cup for the season, the club competes with a cup finalist. The first edition was held in 2007. Since the 2015 edition, the winner qualifies into the Santo Antão Super Cup, a single island competition.  Académica do Porto Novo won this year's edition and will qualify to compete (as champion as they also won the cup) into the single insular super cup and face the cup winner of the north zone Paulense.

Académica Porto Novo won the most titles numbering six, their last one was in 2017.  The remaining are Sporting, Fiorentina and Inter Porto Novo are the other clubs that each has a super cup won.

For the upcoming 2018 season, one participant became listed, the champion Académica Porto Novo

Winners

1 Second place cup winner

Performance By Club

See also
Santo Antão Cup and Super Cup
Santo Antão Island League (South)
Porto Novo Cup

Notes

References

External links
Port Novo Cup at the FCF's Santo Antão Island League (South) page 

Sport in Santo Antão, Cape Verde
Porto Novo Municipality
Football cup competitions in Cape Verde
2007 establishments in Cape Verde